Nadia Awni Sakati is a Syrian-Saudi pediatrician.
Born on 23 May 1938 in Damascus, Syria. She earned her MD from Damascus University in 1965. She worked in the hospital of American University in Beirut, Lebanon and Jackson Memorial Hospital in Miami, Florida. In 1969 she was Fellow in Genetics and Metabolism at the University of California, San Diego.

Dr. Sakati is currently working as a paediatrician and senior consultant for the genetics research center in King Faisal Specialist Hospital in Riyadh, Kingdom of Saudi Arabia.

She described three rare disorders in children, Sakati–Nyhan–Tisdale syndrome with William Leo Nyhan and W.K. Tisdale, Sanjad-Sakati syndrome with Sami A. Sanjad, and Woodhouse-Sakati syndrome, with N. J. Woodhouse

References
 
 Biography of Nadia Awni Sakati, Whonamedit?

Saudi Arabian pediatricians
Syrian pediatricians
1938 births
Damascus University alumni
Living people